Łomnica  is a village in the administrative district of Gmina Mysłakowice, within Jelenia Góra County, Lower Silesian Voivodeship, in south-western Poland. 

The village has a population of 2,000.

It is the location of the Baroque Łomnica Palace.

References

Villages in Karkonosze County